Mohamed Antar (born 10 February 1993) is an Egyptian professional footballer who plays as a winger for Egyptian Premier League club Zamalek.

Honours
Zamalek
Egypt Cup: 2017–18, 2018–19
Egyptian Super Cup: 2019–20
Saudi-Egyptian Super Cup: 2018
CAF Confederation Cup: 2018–19
 CAF Super Cup: 2020

1993 births
Living people
Egyptian footballers
Egyptian Premier League players
Association football forwards
Pyramids FC players
Zamalek SC players
People from Asyut Governorate